Marriage in Buenos Aires is a 1940 Argentine comedy film directed by Manuel Romero.

Cast 
The cast includes:
 Niní Marshall
 Enrique Serrano
 Sabina Olmos
 June Marlowe
 Hilda Sour
 Marcelo Ruggero
 Roberto García Ramos
 Alberto Bello
 Lucy Galián
 Alfredo Jordan
 Berta Aliana
 Mario de Marco

External links
 

1940 films
1940s Spanish-language films
Argentine black-and-white films
1940 comedy films
Films directed by Manuel Romero
Argentine comedy films
1940s Argentine films